Imona Natsiapik (born 1966 in Clyde River, Nunavut) is an Inuit artist.

Her work is included in the collections of the National Gallery of Canada and the McMichael Canadian Art Collection.

References

 1966 births
20th-century Canadian artists
20th-century Canadian women artists
21st-century Canadian artists
21st-century Canadian women artists
Artists from Nunavut
Inuit artists
Living people
People from Clyde River